Nancy Elizabeth Stafford (born June 5, 1954) is an American actress, speaker and author, known for her roles on television. She came to prominence in the 1980s as Michelle Thomas, law partner, on five seasons of Matlock. She later hosted a syndicated TV series called Main Floor (1995–2005), a show about fashion and beauty.

Early life
Nancy Elizabeth Stafford was born in Wilton Manors, Florida, a suburb of Ft. Lauderdale, in 1954, where she was raised as a Southern Baptist. She graduated from the University of Florida with a Bachelor of Arts degree in journalism. She is a practicing Christian.

After graduating from Ft. Lauderdale High School in 1972, she was Miss Florida 1976, competing in the 1977 Miss America Pageant.

Career
Stafford moved to Los Angeles in 1982, where she had her first contract role playing the dual role of Adrienne/Felicia Hunt on the daytime soap opera The Doctors. She had guest starring roles in shows such as Riptide, Remington Steele, Scarecrow and Mrs. King, Who's the Boss?, Hunter, Quantum Leap, and Magnum, P.I.. In 1983, Stafford won her first regular role on the NBC medical drama series St. Elsewhere as Joan Halloran. She played the role for two seasons and came back for one more episode in 1986. She later starred as Patricia Blake in the short-lived ABC series Sidekicks from 1986-87.

Stafford is best known for her role as Ben Matlock's legal partner Michelle Thomas in the legal drama Matlock, from 1987 to 1992. When the show relocated its filming from the west coast, Stafford opted to leave Matlock.  After her departure from Matlock, she began public speaking and hosted Main Floor, a 1990s talk show.

In 2008, she co-hosted the first season of Love, Marriage and Stinkin' Thinkin alongside Mark Gungor. Stafford continued to guest star in many shows, such as ER, Frasier, Babylon 5, Baywatch and The Mentalist.

Stafford is the author of many Christian books, such as: Beauty by the Book: Seeing Yourself as God Sees You, The Wonder of His Love: A Journey into the Heart of God, and her 2006 book, Mothers & Daughters Taking Your Adult Relationship to a Deeper Level.

Personal life
Stafford married Larry Myers, a pastor. She has a step-daughter and grandson. Her older brother, Tracy Stafford, was a two-term Mayor of Wilton Manors, Florida and a five-term member of the Florida House of Representatives.

Filmography

Film

Television

References

External links

Official website

1954 births
Living people
20th-century American actresses
Actresses from Fort Lauderdale, Florida
American film actresses
American television actresses
Christian writers
Fort Lauderdale High School alumni
Miss America 1977 delegates
University of Florida alumni
People from Wilton Manors, Florida
21st-century American actresses
21st-century American women